Provincial Road 542 (PR 542) is a road in southwestern Manitoba, Canada.  At its southern end, it intersects with Manitoba Provincial Road 257 at Kola, Manitoba.  It runs due north until the Trans-Canada Highway near Kirkella, where the road becomes Manitoba Highway 41.

External links 
Manitoba government Official Highway Map

References 

542